In molecular biology, the protein domain b1 refers to the domain b1 of Protein L.  L is a bacterial protein with immunoglobulin (Ig) light chain-binding properties. It contains a number of homologous b1 repeats towards the N terminus. These repeats have been found to be responsible for the interaction of protein L with Ig light chains. N-terminus domain  contains five homologous B1 repeats of 72-76 amino acids each.

References

Protein domains